Hans Hartung (21 September 1904 – 7 December 1989) was a German-French painter, known for his gestural abstract style. He was also a decorated World War II veteran of the Legion d'honneur.

Life
Hartung was born in Leipzig, Germany into an artistic family. He developed an early appreciation of Rembrandt, German painters such as Lovis Corinth, and the Expressionists Oskar Kokoschka and Emil Nolde. In 1924 he enrolled in Leipzig University, where he studied philosophy and art history. He subsequently studied at the Fine Arts academy of Dresden, where he copied the paintings of the masters. The modern French and Spanish works he saw in 1926 at the Internationale Kunstausstellung in Dresden were a revelation to him, and he decided that he would leave his native country to prevent succumbing to provincialism. Consequently,  after a bicycle trip through Italy, he moved to Paris.

In Paris, Hartung had little contact with other artists and copied the works of old and modern masters. He visited the south of France, where the landscape inspired him to a close study of the works of Cézanne, and he developed a great interest in principles of harmony and proportion such as the golden section. In 1928 he visited Munich where he studied painting technique with Max Doerner. In 1929 he married the artist Anna-Eva Bergman and established himself in the French towns of Leucate, and then in the Spanish Balearic Islands, eventually settling in Menorca. He exhibited for the first time in 1931 in Dresden.

The death of his father in 1932 severed Hartung's last bonds with Germany. He was rejected from Nazi Germany on account of being a 'degenerate', because his painting style was associated with Cubism – an art movement incompatible with Nazi Germany's ideals. In 1935, when he attempted to sell paintings while visiting Berlin, the police tried to arrest him. He was able to flee the country with the help of his friend Christian Zervos.

After he returned to Paris as a refugee, Hartung and his wife divorced, and he became depressed. His paintings were becoming more abstract and did not sell well. His friends tried to help him with his financial difficulties, and the sculptor Julio González offered him the use of his studio. In 1939 Hartung married González's daughter Roberta.
 
In December 1939, he became a member of the French Foreign Legion. He was closely followed by the Gestapo and arrested for seven months by the French police. After they learned he was a painter, he was put in a red cell in an attempt to disturb his vision. After being released he rejoined the Legion to fight in North Africa, losing a leg in a battle near Belfort. He earned French citizenship in 1945, and was awarded the Croix de Guerre.

In 1947, in Paris he had his first solo exhibition. By the late 1950s, he had achieved recognition for his gestural paintings, which were nearly monochromatic and characterized by configurations of long rhythmical brushstrokes or scratches. In 1960, he was awarded the International Grand Prix for painting at the Venice Biennale. In 1957, Hans Hartung was the first painter to receive the Rubens Prize of the City of Siegen. 

Hartung's freewheeling abstract paintings set influential precedents for many younger American painters of the 1960s, making him an important forerunner of American Lyrical Abstraction of the 1960s and 1970s. He was featured in the 1963 film documentary School of Paris: (5 Artists at Work) by  American filmmaker Warren Forma.

In 1957, Hartung and Anna-Eva Bergman remarried. He died on 7 December 1989, in Antibes, France.

See also
Tachisme
School of Paris
L'Art Informel
Union des Artistes Allemandes Libres

Notes

References
 La mort de Hans Hartung Le peintre, pionnier puis classique de l'" abstraction ", est mort, vendredi 8 décembre, à l'âge de quatre-vingt-cinq ans, Le Monde. Lundi 11 décembre 1989, p. 1. accessed on October 8, 2006.
Müller-Yao, Marguerite Hui: Der Einfluß der Kunst der chinesischen Kalligraphie auf die westliche informelle Malerei, Diss. Bonn, Köln 1985. 
Müller-Yao, Marguerite: Informelle Malerei und chinesische Kalligrafie, in: Informel, Begegnung und Wandel, (hrsg von Heinz Althöfer, Schriftenreihe des Museums am Ostwall; Bd. 2), Dortmund 2002, 
Rolf Wedewer: Die Malerei des Informel. Weltverlust und Ich-Behauptung, Deutscher Kunstverlag, München, 2007.

External links
 Hans-Hartung.com
 Hans Hartung – Britannica.com
 The Artists.org – Hans Hartung

1904 births
1989 deaths
Abstract expressionist artists
Cubist artists
20th-century French painters
20th-century German male artists
French male painters
20th-century German painters
German male painters
Modern painters
Artists from Leipzig
School of Paris
Painters from Paris
Soldiers of the French Foreign Legion
Recipients of the Croix de Guerre 1939–1945 (France)
French military personnel of World War II
Members of the Académie des beaux-arts
Art Informel and Tachisme painters
French amputees
Emigrants from Nazi Germany to France
Knights Commander of the Order of Merit of the Federal Republic of Germany
Recipients of the Pour le Mérite (civil class)